John Ruhl (April 14, 1873 – November 19, 1940) was an American sculptor of German descent.

Early life 
Ruhl was born in New York City, New York. From an early age, he desired to be an artist. His parents, Anton and Frieda, discouraged his aspirations, and, upon leaving the public school system, his father made him take a job with an insurance company as a clerk. Ruhl hated the work and longed for a career in the art field.

In 1888, he enrolled in the Metropolitan Museum of Art School. The following April, Ruhl won a school-wide contest with his sculpture "For a Yacht Race", a plaster vase engraved with yachts and a dolphin handle. As a result of the contest win and his $100 prize, John's parents approved his request to leave the insurance company and accept a three-year course of study under Frank Edwin Elwell.

Career
Ruhl worked at the Piccirilli Brothers Studios between 1905 and 1920. The studios undertook many projects during those years, but we can confirm John was involved with two. The first were the marble lions in front of the New York Public Library Main Branch at 5th Avenue and 42nd Street. The second is the Lincoln Memorial in Washington, D.C. 

Collectors of antique bookends are familiar with Ruhl's work. John's involvement in creating bookends began in 1915 and continued until his death in 1940, a period of about 25 years. Most of his work was for J.B. Hirsch and Armor Bronze. Some work was also done for K&O (Kronheim and Oldenbusch).  The Encyclopedia of Bookends by Louis Kuritzky contains many of his signed bookends including Dante Standing, Washington Bust, Man Reading, Deep in Thought, Cellist, as well as numerous unsigned bookends: Potter, Jester Lion Indian Scout, Searching Indian, Echo done for Armor Bronze; Washington Crossing the Delaware, Pirate with Sword and Musket, Roman and Scroll for K&O; and several unnamed works for J.B. Hirsch.
 
Attended The Beaux-Arts Institute of Design (BAID)

Ruhl also sculpted the Indian head, Chief Obbatinewat, which is the floor seal in the Shawmut Bank of Boston.

From The New York Sun, April 18, 1894 "David Dudley Field Death Mask" done by John Ruhl. David Dudley Field an American lawyer

John remained a pupil of Mr. Elwell in 1894 and stayed with him at least three years. Family records indicate that John helped set up two memorials: the Edwin Booth bronze bas relief at Mount Auburn Cemetery in Cambridge, Massachusetts and the General Winfield Scott Hancock bronze equestrian statue at Gettysburg, Pennsylvania. It is likely he accompanied Mr. Elwell out of town on both these occasions. The Booth Memorial was completed in 1894 and the Hancock Memorial in 1896. It is possible that John continued his studies at the Metropolitan Museum until the closing of their school in 1894 and then went to study under Elwell. His three years would then span 1894–97. The records that would settle this question do not exist any longer.

April 1894 was a very important month for John. Two days before he created his Death Mask, the April 13th edition of the New York Times reported that the 16th annual exhibition of the Society of American Artists was closing its doors. The exhibition had opened to the public on March 12. The exhibitions of painting and sculpture were available for purchase. Not surprisingly, there were a lot more paintings than sculpture which consisted of "a baker's dozen" of small pieces including one by the famous sculptor Augustus Saint-Gaudens.

In this exhibition, both John and Mr. Elwell had pieces they made for sale. The New York Times reported: "Diana of the Spear by Edwin F Elwell is a plaster statuette whose intention is better than its realization. The nude Diana is an ungraceful and perhaps impossible attitude with her legs apart and her weight on the right toes, while she is in the act of brandishing rather than hurling a spear. The modeling of the right breast and the right arm drawn back in the act of hurling is as questionable as the position of feet and legs. Though Diana was a goddess we have no right to assume that she could or would take such a pose when driving the spear at her antlered prey in the Forest of Arcady". The article was more praiseworthy of John, claiming "There is a good plaster bust of young Mr. Bureau of Philadelphia by John Ruhl".

Exhibition catalogs exist for the various annual exhibitions of the Society of American Artists. A copy of the catalog for the 1894 exhibit exists at the Thomas Watson Library of the Metropolitan Museum of Art. Altogether there were 317 exhibits, with nearly the same number of artists, only 13 of these exhibits were sculptures – all of which were located in the Central Gallery. John was Exhibitor #315 with his "Portrait of Mr. B." Other prominent exhibitors at the event were Alexander Sterling Calder, Augustus Saint Gaudens, and Ruhl's own mentor, Frank Elwell. To be displayed amongst other prominent artists demonstrates Ruhl's sculpting prowess, even at only 21 years of age.

Ruhl's final project was the 1939 GM Futurama Exhibit at the New York World's Fair.  His job was to join the hundreds of other skilled artists and make many of the scale models in the "Building the World of Tomorrow" exhibit. During this time, he was employed by George Wittbold, the builder.

After his death on November 19, 1940, Ruhl was interred at St. Michael's Cemetery in Queens, New York.

Awards
In 1913, John was listed in Who's Who in American Art. His qualifications included "Pupil of the Metropolitan Museum Art School under John Ward Stimson and Francis Edwin Elwell." 

Years later he was also listed in Who Was Who in American Art 1564–1975, a three-volume book edited by Peter Hastings Falk.

John won several Society of Beaux-Arts Architects medals: first place for sculpture in 1913–14, two second places for sculpture in 1915–16, and two first places for sculpture in 1916–17.
 
In January 1915 he was awarded the first prize of $76 ($1,604 current buying power) in the Mrs. Henry Payne Whitney (Gertrude Vanderbilt Whitney) competition for students with a sculpture entitled "Youth." It shows a slender-limbed nude youth reaching out his toe to frighten a frog.

References

Sources
Ask Art: Ask Art:  http://www.antiqueweek.com/ArchiveArticle.asp?newsid=647

Article in Antique Week: http://www.antiqueweek.com/ArchiveArticle.asp?newsid=647

Larkin, Susan Top Cats: The Life and Times of the New York Public  Library Lions San Francisco, Pomegranate 2006

Cocchiarell, Marta, et al. Freeing the Angel from the Stone: The Contribution of the Piccirilli Brothers to Sculpture 1890 to the Present.  New York, Italian American Museum, 2005

McBride, Gerald Collectors Guide to Cast Metal Bookends.   Atglen, Pa.  Schiffer

Kuritzky, Louis and Charles De Costa Collectors Encyclopedia of Bookends: Identity & Values.   Collector Books

Futurama General Motors Corporation 1940

Society of Beaux-Arts Architects. Year Book of the Society of Beaux-Arts Architects  and of the Beaux Arts Institute of Design 1914

Beaux Arts Studio. Society of Beaux Arts Architects Year Book of the Architectural League of New York 1914

Society of Beaux Arts Architects and National Sculpture. Thirtieth Annual Exhibition 1915

Society of Beaux Arts Architects and National Sculpture. Index of Exhibits Thirty-First Annual Exhibition 1916

Falk Peter Hastings Editor in Chief. Who Was Who in American Art 1564-1975                            Madison Conn, Sound View Press 2001 c1999

Society of American Artists. Annual Exhibition Vol 16 (1894) New York

"Prize Winning Art Works Shown in Mrs. Henry Payne Whitney's Studio" New York Herald 17 January 1915:2 https://timesmachine.nytimes.com/timesmachine/1894/04/13/106902886.pdf

Working and Due Book Philadelphia Operative Plasterers Union, Local No 8                                 Philadelphia 1931

Working and Due Book Operative Plasterers and Cement Finishers International                            Association, Local 96 Washington D.C. 1922

Funeral of David Dudley Field" New York Times, 15 April 1894

"Prizes of the Art Schools" The Sun, 28 April 1889

Mrs. H.P. Whitney Prizes Awarded" New York Press, 17 January 1915

1873 births
1940 deaths
American sculptors
People from New York City